Maria Anna Thekla Mozart (25 September 1758 – 25 January 1841), called Marianne, known as Bäsle ("little cousin"), was the cousin and friend of Wolfgang Amadeus Mozart.

Biography

She was born in Augsburg, Germany, the third and only surviving of five daughters of Franz Alois Mozart (a younger brother of Leopold Mozart) and Maria Victoria Eschenbach. Between October 11 and October 26, 1777, 19-year-old Marianne met the 21-year-old Wolfgang in Augsburg. The young people developed a close, probably intimate relationship.

Ten letters of their subsequent correspondence have been preserved, all from Wolfgang to Marianne. These are called the "Bäsle letters" ("Bäsle" is a diminutive form in German, meaning "little cousin"). They are striking for their abundance of scatological and sexual humor. Maynard Solomon translates one passage into rhymed English as shown below (from a letter dated 23 December 1778):
"Come for a bit or else I'll shit. If you do, this high and mighty person will think you very kind, will give you a smack behind, will kiss your hands, my dear, shoot off a gun in the rear, embrace you warmly, mind, and wash your front and behind, pay you all his debts to the uttermost groat, and shoot off one with a rousing note, perhaps even let something drop from his boat."

After Mozart's return from Paris, Marianne accepted an invitation (given in the letter just quoted) to visit Mozart and his family in Salzburg. She accompanied him in January 1779 from Munich to Salzburg and stayed there for about  months, despite the disapproval of Mozart's father Leopold. She may have hoped for marriage to Wolfgang. If so, her wish was shattered; the former warm relationship cooled off. Their last reunion was in Augsburg in March 1781.

Marianne had been educated accordingly to her rank as citizen of the Free City of the Holy Roman Empire, and, as a teenager, gained further social education in Munich. She is described as having been beautiful, endearing, bright, humorous, and in love with life. In 1784, she gave birth to an illegitimate daughter, Maria Josepha, whose father, canon Dr. Theodor Franz de Paula Maria Baron von Reibeld (1752–1807), provided generously for mother and child.

Marianne Mozart remained unmarried her entire life. After the death of her mother, who had been widowed in 1791, she moved to live with her daughter and son-in-law, postmaster Franz-Joseph Streitel, in 1808. Already in 1803 the only grandchild, Carl Joseph, had died in infancy. Moving to Kaufbeuren in 1812, she and her family finally ended up in Bayreuth in 1814, where she lived for 27 years until her death.

Fifty years after her famous cousin, Marianne died in Bayreuth, Germany, at the age of 82. In her estate, the portrait of her cousin was found, which he had sent her from Mannheim in 1778. Only 15 months later, her 58-year-old daughter died. Both were buried in the municipal cemetery in Bayreuth, but the graves can no longer be found. In the course of the years, two memorial plates were placed, one at the Old Coaching House, the other at the entrance of the municipal cemetery.

See also
Mozart and scatology

Notes

References
 Solomon, Maynard (1995) Mozart: A Life. HarperCollins.

Further reading
 Dempf, Peter (2004) Mir ist so federleicht ums Herz, Eichborn Verlag, Frankfurt/Main.  (In German)
 Schad, Martha Hrsg. (2015) Mozarts erste Liebe, Anton H. Konrad Verlag, Weißenhorn.  (In German)
 Wegele, Ludwig (1985) Der Lebenslauf der Marianne Thekla Mozart, Brigg Verlag, Augsburg. (In German)
 Wegele, Ludwig (1990) ... und der nähmliche narr bleibe ich, Verlag C.H. Beck, München.  (In German)

External links

"A Visit to Maria Anna Thekla Mozart", biography.

1758 births
1841 deaths
People from Augsburg
Maria Anna Thekla
18th-century German people
19th-century German people
18th-century German women
19th-century German women